Pratap Govindrao Chikhalikar Patil (born 2 August 1960) is an Indian politician and Bharatiya Janata Party leader from Nanded district. He is a member of the 13th Maharashtra Legislative Assembly. He represents the Loha Assembly Constituency.

Career
Chikhalikar has been described as close to Shankarrao Chavan, but later has become an opponent of his son Ashok Chavan becoming a close junior associate of former Maharashtra Chief Minister the late Vilasrao Deshmukh. He won assembly elections in 2004. In 2007, Chikhalikar, joins Lok Bharati Political outfit during municipality elections there, contesting elections against the Indian National Congress. In 2012 Chikhalikar joined the Nationalist Congress Party & in August 2014, Chikhalikar joined the Shiv Sena.

Positions held
 1999: Unsuccessfully contested Loha Vidhansabha on Congress ticket
 2004: Elected to Maharashtra Legislative Assembly
 2014: Re-elected to Maharashtra Legislative Assembly from Shivsena Party
 2015: Elected as Director of Nanded District Central Co-operative Bank
2019: MP- Nanded loksabha Constituency

References

External links
 Shivsena Home Page

Maharashtra MLAs 2004–2009
Maharashtra MLAs 2014–2019
Living people
Shiv Sena politicians
People from Nanded district
Marathi politicians
India MPs 2019–present
1960 births
Nationalist Congress Party politicians from Maharashtra